Levonyan is an Armenian surname. Notable people with the surname include:

 Alla Levonyan (born 1975), Armenian singer
 Khoren Levonyan (born 1983), American presenter and actor
 Tigran Levonyan (1936 - 2004), Armenian opera singer

Armenian-language surnames